Wurmbea drummondii, also known as the York Gum Nancy, is a species of plant in the Colchicaceae family that is endemic to Australia.

Description
The species is a cormous perennial herb that grows to a height of 1.5–5 cm. Its white to pink flowers appear in June.

Distribution and habitat
The species is found in the Avon Wheatbelt, Geraldton Sandplains and Jarrah Forest IBRA bioregions of western Western Australia. It grows in loam, clay and sandy clay soils on winter-wet sites.

References

drummondii
Monocots of Australia
Flora of Western Australia
Plants described in 1878
Taxa named by George Bentham